Nicholas Roger Swardson (born October 9, 1976)  is an American actor, stand-up comedian, screenwriter, and producer. He is best known for his recurring role as Terry Bernadino in the comedy series Reno 911!, for his work with Adam Sandler's Happy Madison Productions, and for his own personal sketch comedy series Nick Swardson's Pretend Time. He also had starring roles in the films Bucky Larson: Born to Be a Star and 30 Minutes or Less (2011).

Early life
A native of the Minneapolis–Saint Paul area, Swardson was born to Pamela and Roger Eric Swardson, and is the youngest of three siblings; he has a sister, Rachel, and a brother, John.  Roger Swardson (1934–2003) was an editor and journalist—having written for publications such as the Cincinnati Enquirer and City Pages, as well as founding the Grand Gazette, a former Saint Paul community newspaper. Roger Swardson also invested in land development in Saint Paul, revitalizing Grand Avenue, an area now known as Victoria Crossing. Roger and Pamela divorced in 1989. Swardson has Swedish ancestry.

He attended St. Paul Central High School and started acting and performing improv comedy at age 16.  A mischievous student who struggled with alcohol and drugs, Swardson was expelled from school on four occasions for pulling fire alarms in order to go outside and smoke cigarettes, fighting, posting a lewd sign in class, and for smoking marijuana; he was enrolled in a rehab program while still in school.

After graduating in 1996, Swardson decided to pursue stand-up comedy rather than attend college. Although Swardson was a fan of sketch comedy, he saw stand-up comedy as a stepping stone to a career in film, more so than he would working within a comedy troupe.

Swardson is an avid Minnesota Vikings fan. He is also good friends with fellow Minnesota resident Josh Duhamel.

Career
Swardson started performing stand-up at the age of 18, attending open mic nights at the Minneapolis comedy club Acme Comedy Co.. Swardson stated in a 2007 interview with The Portland Mercury that he did his first open mic "as a goof" but he was encouraged by the club owner to perform again and he went on to win the comedy club's award for the "Funniest Person in the Twin Cities". He also went on to perform regularly at Knuckleheads, a defunct comedy club which was located in the Mall of America. Swardson was also an occasional performer at Balls Cabaret.

After garnering some attention within comedy circles, Swardson was selected to perform stand-up at the U.S. Comedy Arts Festival at 20 years of age.  The festival, which up to 2007 was held in Aspen, Colorado, was a yearly festival attended by entertainment insiders and was a place for comics and comedic actors to get exposure to the industry. It was once the largest comedy convention of its kind in the US and became the launch pad for many comedians and comedy writers. After Swardson's first performance at the festival comedian Tony Camin, acting as the night's MC, was quoted as saying: "There's a deal waiting to happen. I can see the TV show now: 'An Aspen Kid With Altitude.'"

Swardson eventually left the Minneapolis–Saint Paul area for New York City where he would appear in such venues as the Luna Lounge, then on to Los Angeles where he headlined at many nightclubs. In addition to his stand-up, Swardson began to get work in commercials and in small roles in both TV in film, such an appearance in an episode of the Al Franken sitcom LateLine in 1999, and playing the role of a crazed David Bowie fan in the 2000 film Almost Famous.

In 2001, Swardson's stand-up act was featured in a half-hour Comedy Central Presents special. He appeared on the show a second time in 2006 — a performance that was featured on the DVD compilation The Best of Comedy Central Presents: Uncensored II released in 2008.

In 2003, Swardson co-wrote the screenplay for Malibu's Most Wanted along with the film's star Jamie Kennedy and Adam Small.  That same year he took on the role of Terry Bernadino on the Comedy Central series Reno 911!. A recurring character throughout the series' run from 2003 to 2009 — in addition to appearing in the film Reno 911!: Miami — Swardson played the role of a flamboyant gigolo who was often seen wearing roller skates.  2003 also marked the beginning of a longtime working relationship and friendship with Adam Sandler. After having seen Swardson's Comedy Central special, Sandler contacted Swardson to ask if he'd be interested in collaborating; Swardson's first project with Sandler was co-writing the screenplay for Grandma's Boy — Swardson also co-produced and had an acting role in the film which was released in 2006.

In 2004, Swardson wrote, produced and starred in a TV show pilot for Comedy Central called Gay Robot, which was based on a comedy bit by the same name that appeared on Adam Sandler's fifth album, Shh...Don't Tell; Comedy Central, however, decided to pass on the TV project.  Swardson then had intentions on making it an animated show, but the show never came to fruition. A copy of the live-action pilot was however made available on MySpace in January 2007. Swardson also resurrected the Gay Robot character on his Comedy Central Series Nick Swardson's Pretend Time.

Swardson's sketch comedy show Nick Swardson's Pretend Time, premiered on Comedy Central on October 12, 2010 and ran for two seasons. The show was produced in conjunction with Adam Sandler’s Happy Madison Productions.  On February 6, 2012 Swardson announced via his Facebook page that there would not be a third season; in his post Swardson stated that "the ratings were solid but it was too expensive for the network and tough creatively," and added that he was "developing a new show where I play a ninja."

In 2011, Swardson starred in, co-wrote and co-produced the film Bucky Larson: Born to Be a Star, also produced by Happy Madison Productions. That same year he starred alongside Jesse Eisenberg, Danny McBride and Aziz Ansari in the film 30 Minutes or Less.

In 2014, Swardson performed the voice of the character Troy on the animated series Chozen.

Filmography

Film

Television

Discography
Gay Robot by Adam Sandler (2004)
Calling Home by Adam Sandler (2004)
Party (2007) (Stand-Up)
Seriously, Who Farted? (2009) (Stand-Up)

References

External links

Gay Robot on MySpace

1976 births
Living people
Writers from Minneapolis
American male comedians
American male film actors
American male television actors
American sketch comedians
American stand-up comedians
Male actors from Minneapolis
20th-century American male actors
21st-century American male actors
20th-century American comedians
21st-century American comedians